Zamia × katzeriana is a species of cycad in the family Zamiaceae, endemic to Tabasco and Chiapas states, Mexico.

References

Whitelock, Loran M. 2002. The Cycads. Portland: Timber Press.

External links

katzeriana
Flora of Mexico
Plant nothospecies